Daniel Sánchez Arévalo (born 24 June 1970) is a Spanish screenwriter and film director. He has worked on more than twenty films since 1995.

Filmography

Film

Short film

Television

References

External links 

1970 births
Living people
Spanish film directors
Spanish male screenwriters
21st-century Spanish screenwriters